William Spicer (May 28, 1864 – December 14, 1949) was a gunner's mate first class serving in the United States Navy during the Spanish–American War who received the Medal of Honor for bravery. He was the great-grandfather of former White House Press Secretary Sean Spicer.

Biography
Spicer was born May 28, 1864, in Liverpool, England, and was living in New York City when he enlisted in the U.S. Navy on November 27, 1890.

Medal of Honor citation
Rank and organization: Gunner's Mate First Class, U.S. Navy. Born: 28 May 1864, England. Accredited to. New York. G.O. No.: 500, 14 December 1898.

Citation:

On board the U.S.S. Marblehead at the approaches to Caimanera, Guantanamo Bay, Cuba, 26 and 27 July 1898. Displaying heroism, Spicer took part in the perilous work of sweeping for and disabling 27 contact mines during this period.

See also

List of Medal of Honor recipients for the Spanish–American War

References

1864 births
1949 deaths
Military personnel from Liverpool
United States Navy Medal of Honor recipients
United States Navy sailors
American military personnel of the Spanish–American War
English emigrants to the United States
English-born Medal of Honor recipients
Spanish–American War recipients of the Medal of Honor